was a Japanese actor and voice actor affiliated with Production Baobab, and subsequently with Production Aigumi. He was the Japanese voice of the Disney character Goofy.

Filmography

Film
Kagemusha (1980) – Hara Jingorō #2

Television animation
1983
Mirai Keisatsu Urashiman (Stinger Bear)
1984
Special Armored Battalion Dorvack (Bob Floyd)
1985
Obake no Q-tarō (Shōta-sensei)
1987
Metal Armor Dragonar (Ben Rooner, Gol)
Zillion (Nick)
1989
Peter Pan no Boken (Sinistra Minion B)
1992
Robin Hood no Daiboken (Bishop Hartford)
Tekkaman Blade (Tekkaman Axe (Godard))
Crayon Shin-chan (Picasso)
YuYu Hakusho (Genbu, Gokumonki, Butajiri)
1993
Doraemon (Jaian's father)
1995
Mobile Suit Gundam Wing (Inspector Acht)
1998
Cowboy Bebop (Piccaro Calvino)
1999
Gokudo (Djinn)
2001
Baki the Grappler (Toma Manuto)
2003
Pecola (Mayor Papazoni)
2004
Sgt. Frog (Kakukaku)
2006
Code Geass (Ryoga Senba)
Ergo Proxy (Barkley)
Demashita! Powerpuff Girls Z (Ramen seller)
2008
Stitch! (Santa Claus)

Original video animation
Legend of the Galactic Heroes (1991) (Baumel)
Bio Hunter (1995) (Boss)

Theatrical animation
Space Adventure Cobra (1982)
Galaxy Investigation 2100: Border Planet (1986) - Parish
Bats and Terry (1987) - Sera
Doraemon: The Record of Nobita's Parallel Visit to the West (1988) - Spectre
The Five Star Stories (1989) - Man A
Nadia: The Secret of Blue Water (1991) - Nautilus Crew
Doraemon: Nobita and the Kingdom of Clouds (1992) - Earthling B
Porco Rosso (1992) - Mamma Aiuto Gang
Apfelland monogatari (1992) - General Der Wenze / Goltz
Case Closed: Captured in Her Eyes (2000) - Detective Narasawa
Crayon Shin-chan: The Storm Called: The Battle of the Warring States (2002) - The Samurai General
Doraemon: Nobita in the Wan-Nyan Spacetime Odyssey (2004) - Policeman
Crayon Shin-chan: The Storm Called: The Kasukabe Boys of the Evening Sun (2004) - Bar Master
Summer Days with Coo (2007) - Swimming Teacher / TV Announcer
Doraemon: Nobita and the Island of Miracles—Animal Adventure (2012) - Lock
Kôdo Giasu: Hangyaku no Rurûshu I - Kôdô (2017) - Senba

Video games
Crash Team Racing (1999) (Papu Papu)
The Bouncer (2000) (Master Mikado)
Kingdom Hearts series (2002-2019; 2020) (Goofy)
Klonoa Beach Volleyball (2002) (Garlen)
Ratchet & Clank: Going Commando (2003) (Abercrombie Fizzwidget)
Skylanders: Spyro's Adventure (2011) (Master Eon)
Skylanders: Giants (2012) (Master Eon)

Dubbing roles

Live-action
Argo (John Chambers (John Goodman))
Asteroid (Lloyd Morgan (Frank McRae))
Back to the Future (1990 Fuji TV edition) (Biff Tannen (Thomas F. Wilson))
Beyond the Sea (Stephen Blauner (John Goodman))
Bulletproof (Bledsoe (Jeep Swenson))
Caravan of Courage: An Ewok Adventure (Wicket W. Warrick)
The Core (Dr. Edward Brazzelton (Delroy Lindo))
The Crow (Gideon (Jon Polito))
The Devil's Double (Saddam Hussein (Philip Quast))
Die Another Day (Q (John Cleese))
ER (Frank the Desk Clerk (Troy Evans))
Ewoks: The Battle for Endor (Wicket W. Warrick)
From Russia with Love (Morzeny (Walter Gotell))
The Godfather (2001 DVD edition) (Philip Tattaglia (Victor Rendina), Luca Brasi (Lenny Montana))
The Godfather Saga (Peter Clemenza (Richard S. Castellano))
GoldenEye (Valentin Dmitrovich Zukovsky (Robbie Coltrane))
GoldenEye (1999 TV Asahi edition) (Jack Wade (Joe Don Baker))
Hard Target (1997 Fuji TV edition) (Douglas Binder (Chuck Pfarrer))
Indiana Jones and the Last Crusade (1998 TV Asahi edition) (Sallah (John Rhys-Davies))
Iron Will (Burton (Richard Riehle))
Lemony Snicket's A Series of Unfortunate Events (Arthur Poe (Timothy Spall))
Mad Max 2: The Road Warrior (1991 TBS edition) (Lord Humungus (Kjell Nilsson))
Meet the Feebles (Bletch (Peter Vere-Jones))
Miller's Crossing (Frankie (Mike Starr))
Mission: Impossible (Luther Stickell (Ving Rhames))
Mission: Impossible 2 (Luther Stickell (Ving Rhames))
My Best Friend's Wedding (Joe O'Neal (M. Emmet Walsh))
Powder (Deputy Harley Duncan (Brandon Smith))
The Purple Rose of Cairo (Monk (Danny Aiello))
Red Dwarf (Captain Hollister (Mac McDonald))
Rollerball (Serokin (David Hemblen))
See Spot Run (Sonny Talia (Paul Sorvino))
Shaolin Soccer (Manager (Sun Chi Wing))
Sleepless in Seattle (Jay Mathews (Rob Reiner))
The Social Network (Larry Summers (Douglas Urbanski))
The Sting (Lieutenant William Snyder (Charles Durning))
Tomorrow Never Dies (Henry Gupta (Ricky Jay))
Twin Peaks (Jacques Renault (Walter Olkewicz))
The World Is Not Enough (R (John Cleese))
The X-Files (Walter Skinner (Mitch Pileggi))

Animation
Animaniacs (Flavio Hippo)
The Brave Little Toaster (Plugsy)
A Bug's Life (Heimlich)
Cats Don't Dance (Woolie Mammoth)
Chip 'n Dale Rescue Rangers (Fat Cat)
Chuggington (Old Puffer Pete)
Disney's House of Mouse (Goofy)
Mickey Mouse Clubhouse (Goofy)
DuckTales (Bouncer Beagle)
An Extremely Goofy Movie (Goofy)
Franny's Feet (Grandpa)
G.I. Joe: A Real American Hero (Sgt. Slaughter)
A Goofy Movie (Goofy)
Goof Troop (Goofy)
Jackie Chan Adventures (Lo Pei)
Oliver and Company (Einstein)
The Simpsons (Season 1-6, Chief Clancy Wiggum)
Spider-Man and His Amazing Friends (Doctor Octopus)
Spider-Man: The Animated Series (Doctor Octopus)
Superman: The Animated Series (Granny Goodness)
The Swan Princess (Speed)
Tom and Jerry (Spike)
The Transformers (Thundercracker)
The Transformers: The Movie (Shockwave, Scourge, Devastator)

References

External links
Official agency profile 

1949 births
2019 deaths
Male voice actors from Nagano Prefecture
Japanese male video game actors
Japanese male voice actors
Production Baobab voice actors